This is the list of rodents of Australia.  Australia has a large number of indigenous rodents, all from the family Muridae. The "Old endemics" group are member of tribe Hydromyini. They have reached Australasia between 11 - 9 million years ago from asia. And the "New endemics" group are member of tribe rattini. They are presumed to have arrived more recently between 4 - 3 million years from Asia. The black rat, brown rat, Pacific rat and house mouse were accidentally introduced to Australia with European settlement, as was a small population of the five-lined palm squirrel near Perth.

Old "endemics" *

Muridae
White-footed rabbit-rat†, Conilurus albipes - extinct
Brush-tailed rabbit rat, Conilurus penicillatus
Rakali (water rat), Hydromys chrysogaster
Forrest's mouse, Leggadina forresti
Lakeland Downs mouse, Leggadina lakedownensis
Lesser stick-nest rat†, Leporillus apicalis - extinct
Greater stick-nest rat, Leporillus conditor
Broad-toothed mouse, Mastacomys fuscus
Grassland melomys, Melomys burtoni
Cape York melomys, Melomys capensis
Fawn-footed melomys, Melomys cervinipes
Bramble Cay melomys†, Melomys rubicola - extinct
Black-footed tree-rat, Mesembriomys gouldi
Golden-backed tree-rat, Mesembriomys macrurus
Spinifex hopping mouse, Notomys alexis
Short-tailed hopping mouse†, Notomys amplus - extinct
Northern hopping mouse, Notomys aquilo
Fawn hopping mouse, Notomys cervinus
Dusky hopping mouse, Notomys fuscus
Long-tailed hopping mouse†, Notomys longicaudatus - extinct
Big-eared hopping mouse†, Notomys macrotis - extinct
Mitchell's hopping mouse, Notomys mitchelli
Darling Downs hopping mouse†, Notomys mordax - extinct
Great hopping mouse†, Notomys robustus- extinct
Prehensile-tailed rat, Pogonomys mollipilosus
Ash-grey mouse, Pseudomys albocinereus
Silky mouse, Pseudomys apodemoides
Plains rat, Pseudomys australis
Bolam's mouse, Pseudomys bolami
Kakadu pebble-mound mouse, Pseudomys calabyi
Western pebble-mound mouse, Pseudomys chapmani
Little native mouse, Pseudomys delicatulus
Desert mouse, Pseudomys desertor
Shark Bay mouse, Pseudomys fieldi
Smoky mouse, Pseudomys fumeus
Blue-grey mouse†, Pseudomys glaucus - extinct
Gould's mouse†, Pseudomys gouldi - extinct
Eastern chestnut mouse, Pseudomys gracilicaudatus
Sandy inland mouse, Pseudomys hermannsburgensis
Long-tailed mouse, Pseudomys higginsi
Central pebble-mound mouse, Pseudomys johnsoni
Kimberley mouse, Pseudomys laborifex
Western chestnut mouse, Pseudomys nanus
New Holland mouse, Pseudomys novaehollandiae
Western mouse, Pseudomys occidentalis
Hastings River mouse, Pseudomys oralis
Pilliga mouse, Pseudomys pilligaensis
Eastern pebble-mound mouse, Pseudomys patrius
Heath mouse, Pseudomys shortridgei
Giant white-tailed rat, Uromys caudimaculatus
Masked white-tailed rat, Uromys hadrourus
False water rat, Xeromys myoides
Common rock rat, Zyzomys argurus
Arnhem Land rock rat, Zyzomys maini
Carpentarian rock rat, Zyzomys palatalis
Central rock rat, Zyzomys pedunculatus
Kimberley rock rat, Zyzomys woodwardi

New "endemics" *

Muridae
Dusky rat, Rattus colletti
Bush rat, Rattus fuscipes
Cape York rat, Rattus leucopus
Swamp rat, Rattus lutreolus
Canefield rat, Rattus sordidus
Pale field rat, Rattus tunneyi
Long-haired rat, Rattus villosissimus

Introduced

Muridae
House mouse¤, Mus musculus
Pacific rat¤, Rattus exulans
Brown rat¤, Rattus norvegicus
Black rat¤, Rattus Rattus

Sciuridae
Five-lined palm squirrel¤, Funambulus pennantii
Grey squirrel¤, Sciurus carolinensis - now extinct in Australia

Notes
†  Extinct

¤  Introduced

* Several of these species are not actually endemic to Australia, but to the Australasian realm, which includes Papua New Guinea and eastern Indonesia.  The headings "Old Endemics" and "New Endemics" are used here in that sense (after Strahan).

See also
 List of mammals of Australia
 List of monotremes and marsupials of Australia
 List of bats of Australia
 List of placental mammals introduced to Australia
 List of marine mammals of Australia

References

External links
 Species listing

 
Rodents